McPhedran is a surname. Notable people with the surname include:

 Ian McPhedran (born 1957), Australian journalist
 John McPhedran (born 1949), Canadian wrestler
 Marie McPhedran, (1904–1974), Canadian novelist
 Marilou McPhedran (born 1951), Canadian lawyer and human rights advocate